His Majesty's hired armed cutter Duke of York served the British Royal Navy from 23 June 1803 to 24 September 1810.

In July 1803 she sent into Portsmouth the American vessel Eagle, from New York bound for Amsterdam, and Galatea, which had been sailing from Bordeaux to Bremen. In August she sent in Young Jane, from Roxborough for France. The next month Duke of York sent Syren, Desrege, master, into Falmouth. Syren had been sailing from Barcelona to Guernsey.

In October 1804, Duke of York brought into Cowes 200 casks of spirits that she had retrieved off the Needles.

In 1807 Duke of York was under the command of Lieutenant A. Mott. On 15 October, under the command of Lieutenant J. Forbes and while in company with the revenue cutters Fox and Seagull, she captured the French privateer Friedland. (Prize money was due to be paid in 1809.)

In March 1810 she sent Hanna, Bantzen, master, sailing from Trequeir, into Weymouth.

In May Lieutenant Elphinstone replaced Lieutenant Richard Bankes in command of Duke of York. Bankes transferred to take command of the gun-brig  on the Leith station. 

Steel's Navy List reported that Duke of York in 1811 was under the command of Lieutenant T. Banks in Guernsey. This is after she was reported returned to her owners, but another source still has her listed as under commission under Lieutenant Banks as late as 1813-14.

Notes, citations, and references
Notes

Citations

References

Hired armed vessels of the Royal Navy